Solidago ohioensis  is a North American plant species in the family Asteraceae, called the Ohio goldenrod. It is found primarily in the Great Lakes region of Canada and the United States, in Ontario, New York, Ohio, Michigan, Wisconsin, Indiana, and Illinois.

Solidago ohioensis is a perennial herb up to 100 cm (39 inches) tall. The leaves are narrow, up to 25 cm (10 inches) long. One plant can produce as many as 500 small yellow flower heads in a compact branching array at the top of the plant. The plant grows in marshes, on sand dunes, and along the banks of rivers.

References

Michigan Flora, University of Michigan
Robert W. Freckmann Herbarium, University of Wisconsin
Ontario Wildflowers

ohioensis
Plants described in 1835
Flora of the Great Lakes region (North America)